Galaxy 30 is a communications satellite owned by Intelsat located at 125° West longitude, serving the North American market. It was built by Orbital ATK, as part of its GEOStar-2 line. Galaxy 30 was formerly known as Galaxy 14R. This satellite provides services in the C-band, Ku-band, Ka-band, and L-band.

History 
Galaxy 30 was contracted in January 2018 by Intelsat to Orbital ATK.

Launch 
Galaxy 30 is an American (Bermuda registered)  geostationary satellite that was launched by a Ariane 5 ECA launch vehicle from Centre Spatial Guyanais, Kourou, French Guiana at 22:04:00 UTC on 15 August 2020. The , 16 kW satellite carries C-band, Ku-band, and Ka-band transponders to provide data transmissions to North America, after parking over 125° West longitude. Galaxy 30 carries a C-band transponder payload for traditional broadcast applications, such as ultra-high definition television distribution, and also Ku-band and Ka-band payloads to support broadband applications. The satellite also hosts a Wide Area Augmentation System (WAAS-GEO 7) payload, transmitting in the L band (specifically, L1 and L5).

References 

Communications satellites in geostationary orbit
Satellite television
Spacecraft launched in 2020
Ariane commercial payloads